The Shire of Corio was a local government area located between Geelong and Werribee, about  southwest of Melbourne, the state capital of Victoria, Australia.

History

Corio was first incorporated as a road district on 3 April 1861, and became a shire on 21 June 1864. Part of the Lara Riding was lost to the Shire of Bacchus Marsh on 15 March 1911, but the same riding gained part of the Shire of Bannockburn on 31 May 1916. The Moorpanyal Riding was transferred to the City of Geelong West on 9 December 1926, becoming its West Ward.

On 18 May 1993, the Shire of Corio was abolished, and along with the Cities of Geelong, Geelong West and Newtown, the Rural City of Bellarine and parts of the City of South Barwon and the Shires of Barrabool and Bannockburn, was merged into the newly created City of Greater Geelong.

Wards

The Shire of Corio was divided into four ridings, each of which elected three councillors:
 Flinders Riding
 Hovell Riding
 Hume Riding
 Peak Riding

Towns and localities

* Council seat.

Population

* Estimate in 1958 Victorian Year Book.

References

External links
 Victorian Places - Corio Shire

Corio
1861 establishments in Australia
1993 disestablishments in Australia
City of Greater Geelong